Chorodna creataria is a moth of the family Geometridae first described by Achille Guenée in 1858. It is found in Taiwan, Nepal and India.

Boarmiini